Jefferson H. Beckwith (18131865) was a Michigan politician.

Early life and education 
Beckwith was born in 1813 in Ontario County, New York. Beckwith studied law in Ellicottville, New York and was admitted to the bar in that state. In 1830, he settled near Ann Arbor, Michigan. He then settled in East Plains, Michigan, which later became part of Lyons Township, Michigan.

Career 
Beckwith was a farmer. On November 8, 1854, Beckwith was elected to the Michigan Senate where he represented the 25th district from January 3, 1855 to December 31, 1856. During his term in the state senate, Beckwith served on the manufactures committee. Beckwith served as a postmaster in Michigan, and served a number of terms as supervisor of Lyons Township.

Personal life 
Beckwith never married.

Death 
Beckwith died in 1865.

References 

1813 births
1865 deaths
Farmers from Michigan
Michigan postmasters
Republican Party Michigan state senators
New York (state) lawyers
People from Ionia County, Michigan
People from Ontario County, New York
19th-century American lawyers
19th-century American politicians